Toyin Omoyeni Falola (born January 1, 1953) is a Nigerian historian and professor of African Studies. Falola is a Fellow of the Historical Society of Nigeria and of the Nigerian Academy of Letters, and has served as the president of the African Studies Association. He is currently the Jacob and Frances Sanger Mossiker Chair in the Humanities at the University of Texas at Austin.

Biography

Early life and education
Falola was born on January 1, 1953, in Ibadan, Nigeria. He earned his B.A. and Ph.D. in History (1981) at the University of Ife, Ile-Ife (now Obafemi Awolowo University), in Nigeria. In December 2020, he earned an academic D.Litt. in Humanities from the University of Ibadan.

Academic career
Falola began his academic career as a schoolteacher in Pahayi, Ogun State in 1970, and by 1981 he was a lecturer at the University of Ife. He joined the faculty at the University of Texas at Austin in 1991, and has also held short-term teaching appointments at the University of Cambridge in England, York University in Canada, Smith College, Massachusetts, in the United States, The Australian National University in Canberra, Australia, and the Nigerian Institute of International Affairs in Lagos, Nigeria.

Research and pedagogy
The primary focus of Falola's research is African history since the 19th century, in the tradition of the Ibadan School. His geographic areas of interest include Africa, Latin America and the United States; and his thematic fields include Atlantic history, diaspora and migration, empire and globalization, intellectual history, international relations, religion and culture.

Falola is the author and editor of more than one hundred books, as well as the general editor of the Cambria African Studies Series (Cambria Press).

Recent courses he has taught include "Introduction to Traditional Africa", an interdisciplinary course on the peoples and cultures of Africa, designed for students with varied backgrounds in African Studies, and "Epistemologies of African/Black Studies", a course on the rise and evolution of African/Black Studies, with a focus on pedagogy, methodology, and  the historical development of scholarship in the field.

Academic honours and awards
Falola has received honorary doctorates, lifetime career awards and honors in various parts of the world, including:

 The Lincoln Award,
 Nigerian Diaspora Academic Prize,
 Cheikh Anta Diop Award,
 Amistad Award,
 SIRAS Award for Outstanding Contribution to African Studies,
 Africana Studies Distinguished Global Scholar Lifetime Achievement Award,
 Fellow of the Nigerian Academy of Letters,
 Fellow of the Historical Society of Nigeria, and The Distinguished Africanist Award.
 He has also received honorary degree of doctors of letters from thirteen universities, including the Federal University of Agriculture, Abeokuta (FUNAAB) during FUNAAB 26th convocation ceremony in November 2018, and Babcock University, in Ilishan-Remo.
Falola served as the president of the African Studies Association in 2014 and 2015.

Books

 Africa, Empire and Globalization. Essays in Honor of A. G. Hopkins, with Emily Brownell. Carolina Academic Press, Durham, NC (2011), .
 The Atlantic World, 1450–2000, with Kevin David Roberts (2008), .
 Yoruba Creativity: Fiction, Language, Life and Songs, with Ann Genova (2005), .
 A History of Nigeria, with Matthew M. Heaton (2008), .
 Britain and Nigeria: Exploitation or Development? Edited (1987). .
 Pawnship, Slavery, and Colonialism in Africa, with Paul E. Lovejoy (2003), .
 African Urban Spaces in Historical Perspective, with Steven J. Salm (2005), .
 Historical Dictionary of Nigeria. With Ann Genova (2009). .
 Mouth Sweeter than Salt: An African Memoir (2005), .
 Yoruba Warlords of the Nineteenth Century, with D. Oguntomisin and G. O. Oguntomisin (2001), .
 Yoruba Gurus: Indigenous Production of Knowledge in Africa (1999), .
 The Power of African Cultures (2008), .
 The Foundations of Nigeria: Essays in honor of Toyin Falola. Edited by Adebayo Oyebade (2003), .
 African Politics in Postimperial Times, with Richard L. Sklar (2001), .
 Counting the Tiger's Teeth: An African Teenager's Story (2014, University of Michigan Press), .
 Africa: An Encyclopedia of Culture and Society 3 vols. Edited with Daniel Jean-Jacques (2015), .
 The Political Economy of Health in Africa. Edited with Dennis Hyavyar (1992), . 
Yoruba Historiography (1991), . 
Pawnship in Africa: debt bondage in historical perspective. Edited with Paul. E. Lovejoy (1994), .
Warfare and Diplomacy in Precolonial Nigeria: Essays in honor of Robert Smith. With Robin Law (1992), .
The Rise and Fall of Nigeria's Second Republic, 1979–1984. With Julius Ihonvbere (1985), . 
Rural Development Problems in Nigeria. Edited with S. A. Olanrewaju (1992), . 
Culture, Politics and Money among the Yorubas. With Akanmu Adebayo (2000), . 
Religious Militancy and Self-assertion: Islam and Politics in Nigeria. With M. H. Kukah (1996), .
Modern Nigeria: a tribute to G. O. Olusanya. Edited (1990), .
Transport Systems in Nigeria. Edited (1986), .
Violence in Nigeria: the crisis of religious politics and secular ideologies (1998), .
The Military in Nineteenth Century Yoruba Politics (1984), .
Islam and Christianity in West Africa. With Biodun Adediran (1983), .
The Transformation of Nigeria: Essays in honor of Toyin Falola. Edited (2002), .
Culture and Customs of Ghana. With Steven J. Salm (2002), .
Nationalism and Africa Intellectuals (2001), .
Narrating War and Peace in Africa. Edited with Hetty Ter Haar (2010), .
Culture and Customs of the Yoruba. With Akintunde Akinyemi (2001), .
Encyclopedia of the Yoruba. With Akintude Akinyemi (2016), .

TOFAC
In Nigeria, there is a conference named after Toyin Falola by the Ibadan Cultural Studies Group; a group chaired by Professor Ademola Dasylva. The first Toyin Falola International Conference on Africa and the African Diaspora (TOFAC) was held in 2011 at the University of Ibadan. The second was hosted in Lagos by the Centre for Black African Arts and Civilization (CBAAC) under the watch of the director general of the centre Professor Tunde Babawale.

References

Additional reading
Adeboye, O. A. Toyin Falola and Yoruba Historiography: The Man, The Mask, The Muse. Carolina Academic Press, Durham, 2010.
Bangura, Abdulkarim. Toyin Falola and African Epistemologies. Springer, 2015.

External links
Toyin Falola website.
Sam Saverance, Biography of Dr. Toyin Falola, The University of Texas at Austin, 2005.
"Episode 96: Creativity and Decolonization: Nigerian Cultures and African Epistemologies", Africa Past and Present podcast. Toyin Falola speaking to Peter Alegi and Peter Limb (17 November 2015)
Toyin Falola, CV

1953 births
20th-century Nigerian historians
21st-century Nigerian historians
Academics of the University of Cambridge
Historians of Africa
Historians of Nigeria
Historians of Yoruba
Living people
Nigerian expatriate academics in the United States
Obafemi Awolowo University alumni
Academic staff of Obafemi Awolowo University
People from Ibadan
University of Texas at Austin faculty
Academic staff of York University
Yoruba academics
Yoruba historians
Presidents of the African Studies Association